Karakat Assembly constituency is an assembly constituency for Bihar Legislative Assembly in Rohtas district of Bihar, India. It comes under Karakat.
.In 2020 assembly elections,  Arun Kumar Singh of CPI(ML) defeated  Rajeswar Raj of Bharatiya Janata Party to emerge victorious.

Members of Legislative Assembly

Election results

2020

References

External links
 

Politics of Rohtas district
Assembly constituencies of Bihar